= Kazhdom Castle =

Castle in Khuzestan Province, Iran

Kazhdom castle
- قلعه کژدم

General information
- Type: Castle
- Location: Izeh County, Iran

Kazhdom castle (Persian: قلعه کژدم) is a historical castle located in Izeh County in Khuzestan Province, The longevity of this fortress dates back to the Early centuries of historical periods after Islam.
